Akhmerovo (Bashkir and , Äxmär) is a rural locality (a village) in Starokuruchevsky Selsoviet, Bakalinsky District, Bashkortostan, Russia. The population was 41 as of 2010. There is 1 street.

Geography 
Akhmerovo is located 27 km southeast of Bakaly (the district's administrative centre) by road. Novokuruchevo is the nearest rural locality.

References 

Rural localities in Bakalinsky District